Ion Bostan (born 31 July 1949) is a professor and researcher from Moldova. He is the rector of the Technical University of Moldova and a member of the Academy of Sciences of Moldova.

Este tatal lui Marcel Ion Bostan [ :* ] ... solistul [deasemenea keyboards ... :) ] // compozitor si textier ... ALTERNOSFERA

Studies
 General Secondary Education: Middle School, Cahul City.
 Higher Education: 1966-1971, Polytechnic Institute "S. Lazo "in Chișinău, Faculty of Mechanics.

Professional and administrative activity
 1971 - 1974 engineer at ″Moldovahidromașina″, Chișinău;
 1974 - present, engineer, assistant, senior lecturer, professor, Department of Mechanisms and Machine Bodies, Polytechnic Institute of Chisinau (today Technical University of Moldova);
 1991 - 1992 the head of the Department of Mechanisms and Machine Bodies;
 1994 - present, president of the Association of Engineers of the Republic of Moldova;
 1992 - 2015 Rector of the Technical University of Moldova;
 2004 - 2006 President of the Black Sea Universities Network;
 2007 - present, President of the Council of Rectors of the Republic of Moldova.

Awards
 Order of the Star of Romania, 2000
 Order of the Republic (Moldova), 1994
 Premiul de Stat în domeniul ştiinţei – 1977 and 1999
 „Inventator Emerit al RM”, „Inventator de Elită al României”
 ordinul „Merite de l’Invention”, Bruxelles: în 1997 – gradul Chevalier, în 1998 – gradul Officier, în 1999 – gradul Comandor
 Medalia de Aur a OMPI, Geneva, 1998
 ordinul pentru ştiinţă „Meritul European”, Bruxelles, 1999.

References

External links 
 Academicianul Ion Bostan - 60
 Bostan Ion, academician

1949 births
Living people
People from Cahul District
Moldovan engineers
Titular members of the Academy of Sciences of Moldova
Recipients of the Order of the Republic (Moldova)